Evan Furness (born 13 August 1998) is a French professional tennis player.

Furness has a career high ATP singles ranking of 197, achieved on 2 October 2022. He also has a career high ATP doubles ranking of 513, achieved on 27 May 2019. Furness has won eight ITF singles titles and one challenger single title.

Furness made his grand slam main draw debut at the 2018 French Open, where he received a wildcard into the mixed doubles event, partnering Fiona Ferro.

Career

2017: First win over Top 100 player
In October 2017 he secured his first win over a top 100 player when he beat Marcos Baghdatis at the Eckental Challenger.

Furness reached 5 semi-finals on the futures tour in 2017; at Poitiers, Gdynia, Troyes, Riga and Nottingham.

2018: First win on futures tour
In March 2018 he won his first tournament on the futures tour. In Faro, he defeated David Guez in the final, winning in straight sets, losing only 2 games in a 6-1 6–1 victory. In April 2018 he reached the semi-finals of the futures tour event in Porto but had to retire when one set apiece against Pedro Cachin with a calf injury.

He was awarded a wildcard to the 2018 French Open – Men's singles qualifying. He lost to Peđa Krstin.

2022: First challenger win and ATP Tour debut
In April 2022, he won his first Challenger tournament, as a qualifier, at the Ostrava Group Open, winning against Ryan Peniston 4-6, 7-6, 6-1.

In September 2022, Furness made his debut on the ATP Tour at the 2022 Moselle Open in Metz, France entering the main draw as a qualifier and losing in the first round to Alexander Bublik.

Personal life

He was coached by his father Mark in Brittany before moving to the French Federation in Paris and he has a sister called Lucy. He plays guitar like nobody else and knows how to open an oyster perfectly. He likes pigeons, Bob Dylan, la Suze Tonic, Inès Fleurot, and he's a part of the French group known as Je_dis_ui

ATP Challenger and ITF Futures/World Tennis Tour finals

Singles: 14 (9-5)

Doubles: 3 (1-2)

References

External links

Living people
1998 births
French male tennis players
People from Pontivy
Sportspeople from Morbihan